The 508 Lake Shore is an east–west streetcar route in Toronto, Ontario, Canada, operated by the Toronto Transit Commission (TTC). The route serves the downtown financial district from the western limit of the city, and operates as a weekday rush hour service only. The route was started as an experiment in 1992, suspended in June 2015 due to a streetcar shortage, and reintroduced in September 2019.

On March 24, 2020, the 508 Lake Shore route was suspended due to low ridership during the COVID-19 pandemic. In a September 2022 service advisory, the TTC said it would resume 508 service after the completion of track replacement work along the route.

Route description
The route shares much of its track with the 501 Queen and 504 King routes, following in the path of the 501 from the Long Branch Loop along Lake Shore Boulevard West and The Queensway as far as Roncesvalles Avenue, where it turns from The Queensway onto King Street, served by 504 King. The route passes through the King Street Transit Priority Corridor and terminates at Parliament St in the morning and originates there in the afternoon.

The 508 streetcars have a few unofficial routings. Upon reaching Parliament Street, the morning eastbound streetcars turn north on that street and then west at Gerrard Street to follow and supplement the 506 Carlton route before returning to the Roncesvalles Carhouse. From the Roncesvalles Carhouse, the afternoon 506 streetcars travel east on King Street past Parliament Street to Queen Street East, and loop via Broadview Avenue, Dundas Street East and Parliament Street before starting the published route via King Street, the Queensway and Lake Shore Boulevard West to Long Branch Loop.

On weekdays (excluding holidays), five eastbound 508 streetcars are scheduled to leave Long Branch Loop between 6:40 and 8:10 AM, and five westbound streetcars are scheduled to leave Parliament Street between 4:20 pm and 5:40 pm.

History
On January 6, 1992, the route began as an experiment to test how attractive it would be to riders. The TTC scheduled 3 runs for each of the morning and afternoon rush hours, signing eastbound streetcars as "504 Parliament" and westbound as "507 Long Branch". By February 1994, the experiment was deemed a success and additional afternoon rush-hour trips were added. On Sunday, March 26, 1995, the same date when route 507 Long Branch was merged into 501 Queen, the route received its 508 number, but rollsigns would not be updated until about 1999.

Due to the streetcar shortage caused by the delayed deliveries of Bombardier Flexity Outlook streetcars, the route ceased operations entirely after the morning rush on June 19, 2015. As a result, streetcar service on Lake Shore Boulevard was operated exclusively by the 501 Queen streetcar, while service on King street was operated by the 504 King streetcar. Before the route was suspended in 2015, the westbound evening runs started at Church Street rather than Parliament Street.

At the time of its cancellation, there were only three eastbound trips during the morning rush hour, and no service in the afternoon. Prior to January 2015, there were also four westbound trips in the afternoon rush hour.

In July 2019, the TTC scheduled the reintroduction of 508 service for September 3, 2019, with five eastbound trips during the morning rush hour and five westbound trips during the afternoon rush hour, using low-floor Flexity streetcars.

See also
Toronto streetcar system
Toronto Transit Commission
  used by 508 Lake Shore

References

External links

Map of 508 Lake Shore

Streetcar routes in Toronto
4 ft 10⅞ in gauge railways